Jaco Pretorius (born 10 December 1979) is a retired South African rugby union outside centre.

Biography
Pretorius was born in Johannesburg, South Africa in 1979. He began playing for the Lions in 2001 and served as the Springboks Sevens captain in 2006. In 2007, he was part of the Emerging Springboks team that won the IRB Nations Cup.

He played two games for Barbarian F.C. in 2008 before signing a three-year deal with the Bulls; his debut game was February 14 against the Queensland Reds. The team won the Currie Cup and the Super 14 Final the following year. They also won the 2010 Super 14 Final, though Pretorius was forced to sit out two games into the season due to a fractured eye socket. In 2011, after fourteen years of playing rugby, Pretorius announced he would be retiring due to a back injury.

References

External links

1979 births
Living people
South African rugby union players
South Africa international rugby union players
Bulls (rugby union) players
Blue Bulls players
Lions (United Rugby Championship) players
Golden Lions players
Rugby union players from Johannesburg
Rugby union centres
Rugby union wings
South Africa international rugby sevens players
Rugby sevens players at the 2006 Commonwealth Games
Commonwealth Games rugby sevens players of South Africa